Elizabeth Spring is an historic water source in Warwick, Rhode Island.  The spring is mentioned in the writings of Rhode Island founder Roger Williams, specifically in reference to Elizabeth, the wife of John Winthrop, Jr., with whom he visited the spring.  The spring is located on an embankment east of the railroad tracks and just north of Old Forge Road at the head of Greenwich Cove.  Its location, which is not readily visible from the road, is marked by a circular millstone, on which a marble slab  with a now-illegible inscription was mounted in 1858.

The spring site was listed on the National Register of Historic Places in 1983.

See also

National Register of Historic Places listings in Kent County, Rhode Island

References

National Register of Historic Places in Rhode Island
Warwick, Rhode Island